The 2011–12 TT Pro League season (known as the Digicel Pro League for sponsorship reasons) was the thirteenth season of the TT Pro League, the Trinidad and Tobago professional league for association football clubs, since its establishment in 1999. A total of eight teams contested the league, with Defence Force as the defending champions. The season began on 9 September 2011 and ended on 29 March 2012 with the crowning of W Connection as the league champion. Dexter Skeene, Pro League CEO, announced on 11 February 2011 that by aligning its seasons with those of the major leagues in Europe, the Pro League will afford the opportunity to further link culture with sport to harness and develop the talent of people in Trinidad and Tobago.

Following a runners-up finish in 2009 and being crowned champions in 2010, T&TEC were promoted from the National Super League to the Pro League on 1 March 2011. However, on 15 July 2011, Skeene announced that Ma Pau would not be part of the upcoming season. On 10 August 2011, Skeene further announced that both Joe Public and FC South End would not be participating in the 2011–12 season.

The start of the season was delayed for both Defence Force and Police by three months as Trinidad and Tobago Prime Minister Kamla Persad-Bissessar announced a limited state of emergency due to the increased crime in portions of the country. As a result, the Ministry of National Security services were implemented into full-fledged duties. The two teams returned to competition after curfew was lifted throughout Trinidad on 12 December 2011.

The first goal of the season was scored by North East Stars' Seon Power against Pro League newcomer, T&TEC, in the eighth minute of the first game on 9 September 2011. Richard Roy of Defence Force scored the first hat-trick of the season against St. Ann's Rangers on 31 January 2012. Roy went on to claim his first Golden Boot award having scored 15 goals to lead the league for Defence Force.

With a crushing 8–1 win over Police on the final match day of the season, W Connection claimed their fourth Pro League title. The winning match was the highest scoring of the season and featured two braces from Jerrel Britto and Andre Quashie. On 30 June 2012, it was announced that due to financial constraints San Juan Jabloteh suspended their football club operations and would not participate in the 2012–13 season.

By finishing as the league leader following the conclusion of the second round, W Connection qualified for the 2012 CFU Club Championship. In addition, by finishing second in the table, Caledonia AIA also qualified for the competition. Due to the change in the season calendar and the start of the CFU Club Championship in March of each year, the Caribbean Football Union and the Pro League agreed to award the league champion and runners-up (W Connection and T&TEC) qualification into the 2013 CFU Club Championship. However, on 5 March 2013, T&TEC withdrew from the 2013 CFU Club Championship citing the club's financial situation as reason to not participate in the competition. As a result, Caledonia AIA entered the competition after finishing third at the conclusion of the league season.

Changes from the 2010–11 season
The following changes were made since the 2010–11 season:
Dexter Skeene, Pro League CEO, announced that the league season would run from 9 September 2011 until 29 March 2012 to align itself with the major leagues in Europe.
The start of the league season was postponed from 19 August 2011 to 9 September 2011 due to a state of emergency implemented by the Government of Trinidad and Tobago in response to growing crime in areas of the country.
There were a number of changes to the clubs competing in the 2011–12 season.
T&TEC were promoted from the National Super League as runners-up in 2009 and as champions in 2010.
Joe Public withdrew from the league; reasons for the withdrawal were not disclosed.
Ma Pau and FC South End withdrew from the league due to financial difficulties.
A three-year title sponsorship was agreed upon by Adam's Construction and San Juan Jabloteh.
 The following changes in qualification for the CFU Club Championship were made:
 The top two teams with the most points in the qualifying table following the conclusion of Round Two qualified for the 2012 CFU Club Championship.
 The top two teams with the most league points qualified for the 2013 CFU Club Championship.

Teams

Team summaries

Note: Flags indicate national team as has been defined under FIFA eligibility rules. Players may hold more than one non-FIFA nationality.

Player transfers

Managerial changes

League table

Positions by round

Results

Matches 1–14

Matches 15–21

Season statistics

Scoring
 First goal of the season: Seon Power for North East Stars against T&TEC, (9 September 2011).
 Last goal of the season: Makesi Lewis for Caledonia AIA against T&TEC, (29 March 2012).
 First own goal of the season: Devon Modeste (St. Ann's Rangers) for W Connection. (16 December 2011).
 First penalty kick of the season: Stern John (scored) for North East Stars against San Juan Jabloteh (25 October 2011).
 First hat-trick of the season: Richard Roy (Defence Force) against St. Ann's Rangers, 25', 44', 73' (31 January 2012)
Most goals scored by one player in a match: 3 goals 
 Richard Roy (Defence Force) against St. Ann's Rangers, 25', 44', 73' (31 January 2012).
 Vurlon Mills (T&TEC) against Police, 13', 62', 90' (27 March 2012).
 Widest winning margin: 7 goals
 W Connection 8–1 Police (29 March 2012)
 Most goals in a match: 9 goals 
 W Connection 8–1 Police (29 March 2012)
 Most goals in one half: 6 goals 
 W Connection v Police (29 March 2012) 3–0 at half-time, 8–1 final. 
 Most goals in one half by a single team: 5 goals 
 W Connection v Police (29 March 2012) 3–0 at half-time, 8–1 final.

Top scorers

Hat-tricks

 * Home team score first in result

Discipline
 First yellow card of the season: Charles Pollard for North East Stars against T&TEC, 9 September 2011
 First red card of the season: Nicholas Valentine for St. Ann's Rangers against T&TEC, 21 October 2011
 Most yellow cards in a single match: 7 
 Caledonia AIA 3–2 T&TEC – 4 for Caledonia AIA (Nuru Abdallah Muhammad, Walter Moore, Ataullah Guerra & Devorn Jorsling) and 3 for T&TEC (Bevon Bass, Kern Peters & Sylvester Teesdale) (29 March 2012)
 Most red cards in a single match: 2 
 St. Ann's Rangers 1–1 T&TEC – 0 for St. Ann's Rangers and 2 for T&TEC (Sylvester Teesdale & Kevon Neaves) (6 January 2012)

Awards

Annual awards
The 2011–12 TT Pro League awards distribution took place on 8 April 2013, over a year after the conclusion of the league season, at Capital Plaza in Port of Spain, Trinidad.

Although W Connection claimed its fourth Pro League championship, Caledonia AIA was named the Team of the Year after the Stallions of Morvant/Laventille claimed the FA Trophy, First Citizens Cup, Lucozade Sport Goal Shield, and CFU Club Championship titles. Jamaal Shabazz was named the Manager of the Year after leading Caledonia AIA to its most successful season in club history. Richard Roy of Defence Force secured his first Player of the Year honour after the Trinidad and Tobago international had a break-out season scoring 15 goals to claim the Golden Boot and Best Forward awards. Jan-Michael Williams, Nuru Abdullah Muhammad, and Ataullah Guerra were respectively named the Best Goalkeeper, Best Defender, and Best Midfielder. The remaining team award was won by W Connection for the Most Disciplined Team of the Year. FIFA international referee, Neal Brizan, won the Referee of the Year for the fifth consecutive year, whereas Boris Punch won the Match Commissioner of the Year.

References

External links
Official Website
Soca Warriors Online, TT Pro League

TT Pro League seasons
1
Trinidad